Lesure is a surname. Notable people with the surname include:

François Lesure (1923–2001), French librarian and musicologist
Jacques Lesure (born 1962), American jazz musician
James Lesure (born 1970), American actor
Hugh R. LeSure (born 1986), American author and musician

See also
Leisure (disambiguation)